Gonthier is a surname. Notable people with the surname include:

Brigitte Gonthier-Maurin (born 1956), member of the Senate of France representing the Hauts-de-Seine department
Charles Gonthier, CC (1928–2009), Puisne judge on the Supreme Court of Canada
Charles Gonthier, Prince of Schwarzburg-Sondershausen (1830–1909), ruler of the principality of Schwarzburg-Sondershausen within the German Empire
Dominique-Ceslas Gonthier (1853–1917), Canadian Roman Catholic priest, Dominican, author, and professor
François-Pierre-Gonthier Maine de Biran (1766–1824), French philosopher
Johanne Gonthier (born 1954), Quebec politician
Linard Gonthier (1565–after 1642), glass painter who worked in Troyes, France
Roger Gonthier (1884–1978), French architect in Limoges

See also
Gonthier Group SA, company that develops, markets, and provides Swiss annuities
Reasons of the Supreme Court of Canada by Justice Gonthier